The Kei women's cricket team is the women's representative cricket team based in the South African city of Mthatha. They compete in the Women's Provincial Programme and the CSA Women's Provincial T20 Competition.

History
Kei Women joined the South African domestic system in the 2010–11 season, playing in the Women's Provincial League, in which they lost all ten of their matches in the West/East Group. Kei have competed in every season of the one-day competition since, but have only ever won one match: in 2017, they beat KwaZulu-Natal Inland by two wickets, helped by Kei bowler Namhla Njani taking 7/24.

They have also competed in the CSA Women's Provincial T20 Competition since its inception in 2012–13, but have never won a match in the competition.

Players

Current squad
Based on appearances in the 2021–22 season. Players in bold have international caps.

Notable players
Players who have played for Kei and played internationally are listed below, in order of first international appearance (given in brackets):

  Nomvelo Sibanda (2019)

See also
 Kei (cricket team)

References

Women's cricket teams in South Africa
Cricket in the Eastern Cape